Jamie Feick (born July 3, 1974) is an American former professional basketball player. A  center from Michigan State University, Feick played in the NBA from 1996 to 2001. He played for the Charlotte Hornets, San Antonio Spurs, Milwaukee Bucks and New Jersey Nets. He was selected by the Philadelphia 76ers in the second round (48th pick overall) of the 1996 NBA draft.

Playing career

He won a high school state championship with Lexington High School in 1989 and 1991.

In his NBA career, Feick played in 201 games and scored a total of 911 points. In the lockout-shortened 1999 season, Feick averaged 11 rebounds per game in 26 games for the New Jersey Nets, and on January 20, 2000 recorded 12 points and 25 rebounds in one game. His last games were in the 2000–01 season, when his career was ended by an Achilles tendon injury. Oddly enough he remained officially on New Jersey's roster until April 2003 despite the Nets attempting to have his contract terminated as early as June 2002.

NBA career statistics

Regular season

|-
| align="left" | 1996–97
| align="left" | Charlotte
| 3 || 0 || 3.3 || .500 || 1.000 || .000 || 1.0 || 0.0 || 0.0 || 0.3 || 1.7
|-
| align="left" | 1996–97
| align="left" | San Antonio
| 38 || 0 || 16.2 || .353 || .308 || .523 || 5.6 || 0.7 || 0.4 || 0.3 || 3.8
|-
| align="left" | 1997–98
| align="left" | Milwaukee
| 45 || 2 || 10.0 || .433 || .308 || .488 || 2.8 || 0.4 || 0.6 || 0.4 || 2.3
|-
| align="left" | 1998–99
| align="left" | Milwaukee
| 2 || 0 || 1.5 || .000 || .000 || .000 || 1.0 || 0.0 || 0.0 || 0.0 || 0.0
|-
| align="left" | 1998–99
| align="left" | New Jersey
| 26 || 16 || 32.7 || .504 || .000 || .717 || 11.0 || 0.9 || 1.0 || 0.7 || 6.8
|-
| align="left" | 1999–00
| align="left" | New Jersey
| 81 || 17 || 27.7 || .428 || 1.000 || .707 || 9.3 || 0.8 || 0.5 || 0.5 || 5.7
|-
| align="left" | 2000–01
| align="left" | New Jersey
| 6 || 0 || 24.8 || .348 || .000 || .500 || 9.3 || 0.8 || 1.3 || 0.5 || 3.7
|- class="sortbottom"
| style="text-align:center;" colspan="2"| Career
| 201 || 35 || 21.5 || .424 || .400 || .629 || 7.1 || 0.7 || 0.6 || 0.4 || 4.5
|}

Other careers
In 2008 Feick joined the Walmart FLW bass fishing tournaments tour. In 2009 and 2010 he competed in the majors division, entering seven tournaments and earning $10,500. In late 2010 he left professional fishing to take the job of head basketball coach at Lexington High School in Lexington, Ohio, where he had attended as a student and won two state basketball titles.

Feick is also the co-founder and CEO of Mid-Ohio Tubing LLC, which he co-founded with Wayne Riffe on August 2, 2013.

References

External links
NBA stats @ basketballreference.com
 NBA.com profile

1974 births
Living people
American expatriate basketball people in Spain
American men's basketball players
Basketball players from Ohio
Baloncesto Málaga players
Centers (basketball)
Charlotte Hornets players
Liga ACB players
Michigan State Spartans men's basketball players
Milwaukee Bucks players
New Jersey Nets players
Oklahoma City Cavalry players
People from Lexington, Ohio
Philadelphia 76ers draft picks
San Antonio Spurs players
Sportspeople from Mansfield, Ohio